Die Liebenden vom Hotel von Osman is a 2001 German short film directed by İdil Üner. It stars Üner herself and Fatih Akın in the cast.

External links 
 

2001 films
2000s German-language films
German comedy short films
2000s German films